The Tajikistani records in swimming are the fastest ever performances of swimmers from Tajikistan, which are recognised and ratified by the National Swimming Federation of the Republic of Tajikistan.

All records were set in finals unless noted otherwise.

Long Course (50 m)

Men

Women

Mixed relay

Short Course (25 m)

Men

Women

Mixed relay

References

Tajikistan
Records
Swimming